The Last Jew in Vinnitsa is a photograph taken during the Holocaust in Ukraine showing an unknown Jewish man near the town of Vinnitsa (Vinnytsia) about to be shot dead by a member of Einsatzgruppe D, a mobile death squad of the Nazi SS. The victim is kneeling beside a mass grave already containing bodies; behind, a group of SS and Reich Labour Service men watch.

History
The photograph dates from some time between mid-1941, when the Germans occupied the oblast (region) of Vinnytsia, and 1943. During this period there were numerous massacres of Jews in the oblast, including in the town itself on 16 and 22 September 1941 and April 1942, after which those spared were sent to labour camps and Yerusalimka, Vinnitsa's Jewish quarter, was largely razed. The Germans' summer uniforms mean the photograph is unlikely to have been taken in winter.

The photograph was circulated in 1961 by United Press (UPI) during the trial of Adolf Eichmann. UPI had received it from Al Moss (b. 1910) a Polish Jew who acquired it in May 1945 shortly after he was liberated from Allach concentration camp by the American 3rd Army. Moss, living in Chicago in 1961, wanted people "to know what went on in Eichmann's time". The UPI copy was published over a full page of The Forward.

Later sources give sometimes contradictory details of the picture. Some say that the original physical image was in an Einsatzgruppe member's photograph album, or removed from the pocket of a dead soldier; and that written on its reverse side was "Last Jew in Vinnitsa", now widely used as the image's name. Several people have contacted Die Welt, each purporting to identify the shooter as a relative.

Significance
The photograph has become iconic.  Some features are unusual among well-known Holocaust pictures: it was taken during the Holocaust rather than after its end, and presumably by someone complicit in the killing; it depicts Einsatzgruppen rather than concentration or extermination camps; the focus is on a solitary victim rather than a multitude.

The photograph has been reproduced, with different degrees of cropping, in many books and museum exhibits about the Holocaust. Books include ones by Guido Knopp and Michael Berenbaum. Exhibits include in Berlin at "Questions on German History" in the Reichstag building from 1971 to 1994, and then at Topography of Terror and the Memorial to the Murdered Jews of Europe; the Institute of National Remembrance in Poland; the United States Holocaust Memorial Museum; and Yad Vashem.

The photograph was used on the cover of Agnostic Front's 1984 album Victim in Pain, liable to be interpreted as part of the Nazi chic then current in the New York hardcore scene. Roger Miret later said his thinking had been "this needs to be publicized in order to prevent history from repeating itself."

See also
Photography of the Holocaust

References

External link

Black-and-white photographs
World War II massacres
Military history of Germany during World War II
Military history of Ukraine during World War II
The Holocaust in Ukraine
Reichskommissariat Ukraine
Einsatzgruppen
1940s photographs
Holocaust photographs
History of Vinnytsia
Unidentified people
1940s deaths
People from Vinnytsia
Ukrainian Jews who died in the Holocaust
People notable for being the subject of a specific photograph